Opapimiskan Lake Airport  is adjacent to Opapimiskan Lake, Ontario, Canada.

References

Registered aerodromes in Kenora District